Charcandrick West (born June 2, 1991) is a former American football running back. He played college football at Abilene Christian University and signed with the Kansas City Chiefs as an undrafted free agent in 2014.

Early life
West was born in Shreveport, Louisiana and later lived in Cullen, Louisiana. He attended high school at Springhill High School in Springhill, Louisiana, where he lettered all four years in football for head coach Joey Pesses. He was named all-state his senior year after earning all-district honors in his sophomore, junior, and senior years. As a senior, he rushed for 1,350 for 16 touchdowns on 89 carries.

In addition to his successful football career, West was a standout sprinter on the track & field team. He still holds the school and district record in the 100-meter dash with a time of 10.34 seconds.

College career
West originally committed to Louisiana Tech University as a cornerback in 2010. He was also recruited by Arkansas, Arkansas State, Louisiana-Monroe, and Nebraska.

West transferred to Abilene Christian University during summer training camp. After transferring, West switched from cornerback to running back.

Collegiate statistics

Professional career

Kansas City Chiefs

2014 season
West signed with the Kansas City Chiefs as an undrafted free agent on May 12, 2014.

West was released during the final round of cuts during the 2014 season on August 30. The next day, after clearing waivers, the Chiefs signed West to their practice squad. On November 11, he was elevated to the Chiefs' active roster. He appeared in six games in his rookie season, primarily on special teams.

2015 season
On October 11, 2015, running back Jamaal Charles tore his ACL and was ruled out for the rest of the season, and West started in his place. His first start was in Week 6 against the Minnesota Vikings. Through Week 11, he had rushed for 373 yards on 98 rushing attempts. He was taken out early from a hamstring injury in the Week 11 game against the San Diego Chargers. Running backs Knile Davis and Spencer Ware backed up West for the remainder of the season. He finished the season with 634 yards on 160 carries, along with four rushing touchdowns. The Chiefs made the playoffs and faced off against the Houston Texans in the Wild Card Round. In the 30–0 victory over the Texans, he had eight rushes for 26 yards. In the Divisional Round against the New England Patriots, he had 61 rushing yards and a rushing touchdown in the 27–20 loss.

2016 season
On September 18, 2016, West ran for a season-high 61 yards on six carries in a Week 2 loss to the Houston Texans. On October 30, 2016, West ran for 52 yards and a season-high 14 carries against the Indianapolis Colts. On November 20, 2016, West caught three passes for a season-high 42 yards against the Tampa Bay Buccaneers. On December 8, 2016, West scored his first touchdown of the season in Week 14 against the Oakland Raiders. Overall, he finished the 2016 regular season with 293 rushing yards, one rushing touchdown, 28 receptions, 188 receiving yards, and two receiving touchdowns. The Chiefs made the playoffs and faced off against the Pittsburgh Steelers in the Divisional Round. In the 18–16 loss, he had two receptions for 14 yards.

2017 season
With the emergence of Kareem Hunt in the Chiefs' backfield, West's role was in the receiving game for the majority of his output. In the season opener against the defending Super Bowl champion New England Patriots on Thursday Night Football, he had a 21-yard rushing touchdown late in the fourth quarter to put the Chiefs up by two possessions in the 42–27 victory. On October 8, against the Houston Texans, he had two receptions for 12 yards and two receiving touchdowns. Overall, he finished the 2017 season with 72 rushing yards, two rushing touchdowns, 27 receptions, 150 receiving yards, and two receiving touchdowns. The Chiefs made the playoffs and faced off against the Tennessee Titans in the Wild Card Round. In the 22–21 loss, he had two receptions for one yard but added three kick returns for 66 net yards.

2018 season
West was released by the Chiefs on August 22, 2018.

New York Jets
On August 24, 2018, West signed with the New York Jets. He was released on September 1, 2018.

Kansas City Chiefs (second stint)
On December 3, 2018, West re-signed with the Kansas City Chiefs. He recorded two receptions for 37 receiving yards, one of them for a touchdown, on the 2018 season.

Indianapolis Colts
West signed with the Indianapolis Colts on August 19, 2019. He was released on August 31, 2019.

Retirement
West announced his retirement on December 3, 2019.

Personal life
West is the older cousin of Tampa Bay Buccaneers linebacker, Devin White.

References

External links

Abilene Christian Wildcats bio

1991 births
Living people
Springhill High School (Louisiana) alumni
Players of American football from Shreveport, Louisiana
American football running backs
Abilene Christian Wildcats football players
Kansas City Chiefs players
New York Jets players
Indianapolis Colts players